Israel competed at the 1984 Summer Olympics in Los Angeles, United States.  The nation returned to the Summer Games after participating in the American-led boycott of the 1980 Summer Olympics. 32 competitors, 24 men and 8 women, took part in 46 events in 11 sports.

Results by event

Athletics

Boxing

Canoeing

Fencing

Gymnastics

Judo

Rhythmic gymnastics

Sailing

Shooting

Swimming

Tennis

Weightlifting

References

External links
Official Olympic Reports

Nations at the 1984 Summer Olympics
1984
Summer Olympics